A Rare Bird (French: Un oiseau rare) is a 1935 French comedy film directed by Richard Pottier and starring Pierre Brasseur, Max Dearly and Monique Rolland.

The film's sets were designed by the art directors Robert Hubert and Jacques Krauss.

Cast
 Pierre Brasseur as Jean Berthier  
 Max Dearly as Melleville  
 Monique Rolland as Renée 
 Charles Dechamps as Le directeur de l'hôtel  
 Jean Tissier as Mascaret  
 Madeleine Guitty as Léonie  
 Henri Vilbert as Grégoire  
 Claire Gérard as Mme Berthier  
 Pierre Larquey as Valentin  
 Marcel Duhamel as Le baron Tourtau  
 Madeleine Suffel as La baronne Tourtau  
 Anthony Gildès as Le sourd 
 Léon Arvel as Broux  
 Carlos Avril 
 Lou Bonin 
 Marguerite de Morlaye as La danseuse au bal masué  
 Geno Ferny as Le membre du conseil d'administration  
 Georges Jamin as Un montagnard  
 Liliane Lesaffre as L'aubergiste 
 Maurice Marceau as Le danseur au chalet  
 Pierre Sabas

See also 
 Three Men in the Snow (1936)
 Paradise for Three (1938)
 Three Men in the Snow (1955)
 Three Men in the Snow (1974)

References

Bibliography 
 James Robert Parish. Film Actors Guide. Scarecrow Press, 1977.

External links 
 

1935 films
French comedy films
1935 comedy films
1930s French-language films
Films directed by Richard Pottier
Films based on works by Erich Kästner
Films set in hotels
Films set in the Alps
Skiing films
French black-and-white films
1930s French films